Ritsuko Nagao (born circa 1934) is the first woman to serve as the Cabinet of Japan's Minister of Justice.

In 1996, Nagao was appointed to the Cabinet of Japan as the Minister of Justice by Ryutaro Hashimoto, where she was the only woman and only appointee who was not a member of Parliament already. Before her appointment as the Minister of Justice, she worked as a bureaucrat in the Health and Welfare Ministry.

References

External Resources 
 "Overview of social welfare services in Japan '94" - Report Nagao co-authored with the Japanese National Council of Social Welfare

Date of birth uncertain
1934 births
Women government ministers of Japan
20th-century Japanese women politicians
20th-century Japanese politicians
Ministers of Justice of Japan
Female justice ministers
Liberal Democratic Party (Japan) politicians